The Former Indian National Army Monument (Chinese: 印度国民军纪念碑) is a historical site and a demolished war memorial at the Esplanade Park located at Connaught Drive within the downtown of Singapore.

History

Foundation stone laying by Subhas Chandra Bose and construction

The monument was constructed to commemorate the "Unknown Warrior" of the Indian National Army (INA). The words inscribed on the war memorial were its motto, which is Unity (Ittehad), Faith (Ittemad) and Sacrifice (Qurbani). It was built during the Japanese Occupation of Singapore as the Japanese and the INA had one enemy in common, i.e., the British.

Subhas Chandra Bose ("Netaji") laid the foundation stone on 8 July 1945, and the words inscribed upon the War Memorial were the motto of the INA: Unity (Etihaad), Faith (Etmad) and Sacrifice (Kurbani). The monument was then erected within a month by the Japanese in August 1945, a few months before Singapore was recaptured by the British. The construction of the monument was proposed by Bose, the co-founder of the INA and Head of State of the Provisional Government of Free India. The INA was backed by the Japanese forces for its goal of gaining India's independence from Britain.

Demolition by British

Lord Louis Mountbatten, the head of Southeast Asia Command, ordered the Former Indian National Army Monument to be demolished when Singapore was recaptured by the Allies in 1945. It has been suggested by some historians that Mountbatten's decision to demolish the INA memorial was part of a larger effort to prevent the spread of the socialist ideals of the INA in the political atmosphere of the Cold War and the decolonization of Asia. In 1995, the National Heritage Board of Singapore marked the place as a historical site. A Cenotaph has since been erected at the site where the memorial once stood.

Restoration: Erection of plaque by National Heritage Board

In 1995, the National Heritage Board marked the place as a historical site and subsequently with financial donations from the Indian community in Singapore, a new monument commemorating the previous one was erected on that spot.

Gallery

See also
 Indian National Army related
 Cathay Building
 Farrer Park Field
 INA Martyrs' Memorial
 Indian National Army in Singapore
 INA treasure controversy

 Other war memorials in Singapore
 Civilian War Memorial
 Kranji War Memorial
 The Cenotaph, Singapore

 General
 History of Singapore
 Japanese Occupation of Singapore
 Greater India

References

Demolished buildings and structures in Singapore
National monuments of Singapore
Downtown Core (Singapore)
World War II memorials
Monuments and memorials in Singapore
Indian National Army
Indian military memorials and cemeteries